The 2019 Team Bath netball season saw Team Bath finish third in the 2019 Netball Superleague regular season and qualify for the playoffs. In the semifinals they lost to the eventual overall champions, Manchester Thunder. Team Bath subsequently defeated Loughborough Lightning in the third place play-off.

Squad

Preseason

Fast5 Netball All-Stars Championship
On 13 October 2018, Team Bath played in the Fast5 Netball All-Stars Championship. They were knocked out in the double elimination stage.
Double Elimination Stage

Friendly

Tri-Tournament
On 15 December 2018 Team Bath hosted and won a three team tournament which also featured Surrey Storm and benecosMavericks. The tournament was broadcast live on BBC Sport.

Regular season

Fixtures and results

Final table

Playoffs

Semi-final

3rd-place play-off

Team Bath end-of-season awards

References

2019 Netball Superleague season
2019